Egnatia (Greek: Εγνατία) is a former municipality in the Ioannina regional unit, Epirus, Greece. Since the 2011 local government reform it is part of the municipality Metsovo, of which it is a municipal unit. The municipal unit has an area of 131.424 km2. In 2011 its population was 2,331. The seat of the municipality was in Mikro Peristeri.  The municipal unit is connected with both the GR-6/E92 (Larissa - Ioannina - Igoumenitsa) and the new Via Egnatia.

Subdivisions
The municipal unit Egnatia is subdivided into the following communities (constituent villages in brackets):
Chrysovitsa (Chrysovitsa, Ampelia, Analipsi, Myloi, Xiriko, Siolades)
Megali Gotista (Megali Gotista, Baltouma)
Mega Peristeri (Mega Peristeri, Ampelakia, Karyofyto, Kastri, Kerasia, Milies)
Mikra Gotista (Mikra Gotista, Agios Minas, Batza, Riza, Sioutsos)
Mikro Peristeri (Mikro Peristeri, Giarakari, Neo Gerakari, Palaiochori, Prosilia, Rachoula, Tampouria)
Sitsaina

References

Populated places in Ioannina (regional unit)